Unable Records is an independent record label headquartered in Cherry Hill, NJ.  The label was founded in 2007 by partners Mike Ransom, Amanda Price Ransom, Kevin Hanning, and Devon Bradford in Jacksonville, FL.  In the fall of 2008, Unable Records relocated to Southern New Jersey, but continued to operate a small office in Jacksonville for several more years.

In 2012, Unable Records merged with the NJ-based recording studio, 0x1 Sound Studio.  The merger created a parent company known as Unable Music Group, of which Unable Records and 0x1 Sound Studio are separate divisions, along with Unable Distribution. During the merger, founding partners Kevin Hanning and Devon Bradford left the company, being replaced by 0x1 Sound Studio owner/engineer Jason Ruch. The merger also allowed for Unable Records to move into its current location, occupying office space in a commercial park in Cherry Hill, NJ, not far from Philadelphia, PA.

Unable Records specializes in the punk rock, ska, hardcore, and metal genres, but has also put out EDM/Dance, hip hop, jazz, indie rock, alternative, pop and horror releases. Unable Records has worked many with bands, including Point Blank, The Bastard Suns, No Fuego, Murder Majesty, Ransom Price, Mexican Ape-Lord, Mongrel, In The Go, Violence in Ascension  and King Rat. Unable Records has also worked with artists such as Raquel Castro, Liz Primo, Mariah Simmons, Dark Intensity, Amai Liu, DJ Lynnwood, among others.

Artists

Punk

 Banned Anthem
 The Bastard Suns
 Cavaverman (Italy)
 The Clap
 The Cuthbert Kids
 Fury Within
 King Rat
 La Melancolía de Don Quixote (Panama)
 Loss of Effect
 Murder Majesty
 No Fuego
 Point Blank
 Ransom Price
 The Turnbucklers
 Two Step With Marlon Brando

Metal

 American Noir
 Binary Creed (Sweden)
 Blood Tribe
 Demons Within
 Gasoline Guns (Ukraine)
 Loss of Reason
 Mexican Ape-Lord (former Meliah Rage)
 Mongrel
 Nation of Decay
 Nations
 Siravo
 Tides of Deception
 To The Pain
 Valleys
 Vengince
 Violence in Ascension (VIA)
 Volt

Alternative/Indie Rock

 208 Talks of Angels (Russia)
 Halfblack
 In The Go (Croatia)
 Nadia Kazmi
 One Eyed Jack (Italy)
 Shame (Italy)
 Square Head Killers (Spain)
 Subjerk

EDM/Dance & Pop

 Aki Starr
 Amai Liu
 Dark Intensity
 DJ Lynnwood
 Liz Primo
 Jennifer Lafayette
 Mariah Simmons
 Raquel Castro

References

External links 
 Unable Records Website
 Unable Music Group Website

Indie rock record labels
Alternative rock record labels